Natalie Cecilia Elphicke  (née Ross; born 5 November 1970) is a British Conservative Party politician and finance lawyer. At the 2019 general election, she was elected as the Member of Parliament (MP) for Dover, succeeding her husband Charlie Elphicke following allegations of sexual harassment.

Prior to the her parliamentary career, Elphicke specialised in housing finance and conservative policy development. She was the author of the 2010 report Housing People; Financing Housing for the conservative think-tank Policy Exchange. She led the Conservative Policy Forum when it was launched in 2011. She is a director of the privately funded Housing and Finance Institute set up by the Cameron–Clegg coalition, following a review she wrote with Keith House. She was a non-executive director of the Student Loans Company, and chair of its Audit and Risk Committee. She was also an independent member of the Audit and Risk Committee at the Department for Education from 2016 to 2019. Elphicke is a Freeman of the City of London.

Early life and career
Ross was born in Welwyn Garden City, England and grew up in social housing. She attended Queenswood School in Hertfordshire, Clarendon House Grammar School in Ramsgate and Canterbury College, before studying law at the University of Kent in Canterbury, gaining an LLB (Hons) degree. She was called to the Bar at Lincoln's Inn in 1994 on a Hardwicke Scholarship, and admitted as a solicitor in 1999. She worked as a lawyer for the Inland Revenue from 1995 to 1997.

Elphicke worked for Stephenson Harwood, becoming a partner in their banking practice. She left in 2013 to found Million Homes, Million Lives, with Calum Mercer, a former finance director at Circle Housing. However, this company was dissolved in 2016.

The Elphicke-House Report
Elphicke co-authored a review into the role of local authorities in providing housing. Announced in the 2013 Autumn Statement, the remit included the restriction that any proposals should not involve breaching the Housing Revenue Account borrowing cap. It involved canvassing the views of over 400 organisations up and down the country. The review entitled From statutory provider to Housing Delivery Enabler: Review into the local authority role in housing supply was published on 27 January 2015.

Housing and Finance Institute

In January 2017, she launched a pilot scheme to facilitate a more effective way of integrating the provision of infrastructure such as water, electricity, gas, broadband and roads in proposals to develop housing. Following an initial report due by the end of January, the scheme was due to run until May 2017, with reports being submitted to the MPs Gavin Barwell, Minister of State for Housing and Planning and Stephen Hammond MP, chair of the All Party Parliamentary Group on Infrastructure.

Parliamentary career
Elphicke was selected as the Conservative candidate for the Dover constituency on 8 November 2019. She was the only name on the ballot in the selection vote at the local association. She had previously narrowly lost out to Matt Hancock for selection as the candidate for West Suffolk prior to the 2010 general election. Dover had previously been represented by her husband Charlie, who had stood down after being charged with three counts of sexual assault against two women. She was elected as the MP for the seat at the 2019 general election with a majority of 12,278.

In February 2020, Elphicke was appointed as a Parliamentary Private Secretary at the Ministry of Housing, Communities and Local Government. In May 2020, she became the chair of the New Homes Quality Board, an independent body created by the government to create a framework for improving quality in the house building industry. For this role she earned £21,000 from May to November 2020 and earned £3,000 per month from January 2021 to April 2022 for approximately 8 hrs work per week.

Following England's defeat in the UEFA Euro 2020 Final, Elphicke was criticised for a private message in which she asked if it would be "ungenerous to suggest" that striker Marcus Rashford, campaigner for free school meals, "should have spent more time perfecting his game and less time playing politics". She later apologised for her remarks saying: "I regret messaging privately a rash reaction about Marcus Rashford's missed penalty and apologise to him for any suggestion that he is not fully focused on his football".

In July 2021, she was one of five MPs found to have breached their code of conduct by the Commons Select Committee on Standards for attempting to influence senior judges in November 2020 in her husband's sentencing appeal after his conviction for sexual assault. The committee recommended that Elphicke and two other MPs receive a one-day suspension from parliament. She apologised for her actions.

On Christmas Day 2021, Elphicke tweeted in a thread that although she supported helping "those in need" that it was "vital" that "the treacherous small boats crossings" were brought to an end. She said that people make these journeys "in the hands of ruthless criminal gangs". She was criticised for the tweets by the SNP Westminster leader Ian Blackford and Scottish Green MSP Ross Greer as they coincided with a day that Christians traditionally celebrate the story of Jesus being born after Mary and Joseph had been offered refuge in a stable.

On 17 March 2022, Elphicke attended a protest against the mass sacking of 800 staff members by P&O ferries in Dover. She was heckled by some protestors who blamed her party for laws that allowed the sackings to take place which she called "nonsense".

She supported Penny Mordaunt in the July–September 2022 Conservative Party leadership election.

Personal life
She married Charlie Elphicke in 1995; he is the former Conservative Party MP for Dover. The couple have a son and a daughter. After his conviction in July 2020 for sexual assault, she announced that they had separated after a 25-year marriage. After he was sentenced in September to two years in jail for the offences, Elphicke spoke out in support of his appeal against the conviction and sentencing, as, although she felt that he had "behaved badly", she thought the sentence was "excessive" and criticised the court as being "on a bit of a mission". After he lost his appeal in March 2021, she was reported as having ended the marriage. In July 2020 she sold the story of her divorce to The Sun tabloid newspaper for £25,000. 

She received an OBE in the 2015 Queen's Birthday Honours for her services to housing.

References

External links

1970 births
20th-century English lawyers
21st-century English lawyers
21st-century British women politicians
Alumni of the University of Kent
Conservative Party (UK) MPs for English constituencies
Female members of the Parliament of the United Kingdom for English constituencies
Housing in the United Kingdom
Living people
Members of the Parliament of the United Kingdom for Dover
Officers of the Order of the British Empire
People from Stevenage
UK MPs 2019–present
20th-century English women
20th-century English people
21st-century English women
Spouses of British politicians